Simon Ashley Almaer (born 12 July 1969) is an English first-class cricketer who has played for Oxford University Cricket Club. His highest score of 67 came when playing for Oxford University against Lancashire County Cricket Club.
 
He also played in a match for the USA against Canada in a non-first-class match.

References

English cricketers
Oxford University cricketers
Living people
1969 births
People from Wanstead
Alumni of St Catherine's College, Oxford